The 1919 season of Úrvalsdeild was the eighth season of league football in Iceland. The same four teams entered this season with KR won their second title and breaking the six-year run of Fram.

League standings

Valur did not show up against Víkingur. The points were awarded
to Vikingur with no goals credited to either team.

Results

References

Úrvalsdeild karla (football) seasons
Iceland
Iceland
Urvalsdeild